Nibiru may refer to:

 Nibiru (Babylonian astronomy), a term in Akkadian language for a crossing or equinox
 Nibiru, a fictional planet in Star Trek Into Darkness
 Nibiru (hypothetical planet), proposed by Zecharia Sitchin
 Nibiru cataclysm, a supposed impending disastrous encounter between Earth and a large astronomical object
 Nibiru (album), a 2019 music album by Ozuna, and its title track
 NiBiRu: Age of Secrets, a 2005 computer adventure game

See also 

 Nibiru Sociedad Astronómica ('Nibiru Astronomical Society'), at the National Autonomous University of Mexico
 Neberu, fictional characters in Demon: The Fallen
 "Land of Nibiru", a song by Aminata Savadogo from the 2015 album Inner Voice